Spodnji Žerjavci is a settlement in the Municipality of Lenart in northeastern Slovenia. It lies in the Slovene Hills, just off the road from Lenart towards Benedikt. The area is part of the traditional region of Styria. It is now included in the Drava Statistical Region.

There are two small chapels in the settlement. One dates to 1869 and the second dates to the early 20th century.

References

External links
Spodnji Žerjavci on Geopedia

Populated places in the Municipality of Lenart